Tell Me... is an album led by trombonist Jimmy Knepper which was recorded in Holland in 1979 and originally released on the Dutch Daybreak label.

Reception 

The Allmusic review by Ken Dryden states "Veteran trombonist Jimmy Knepper has led relatively few recording sessions, but this 1979 studio date is well worth acquiring. Knepper brought his own arrangements to the studio for his pickup group of European musicians to play, and all went well throughout the session".

Track listing 
All compositions by Jimmy Knepper except where noted.
 "Tell Me" – 8:17
 "Brewery Boys Blues" – 6:28
 "Nearer My God in G" – 8:52
 "Ecclusiastics" (Charles Mingus) – 9:39
 "I Thought About You" (Jimmy Van Heusen, Johnny Mercer) – 2:48
 "Home (When Shadows Fall)" (Harry Clarkson, Geoffrey Clarkson, Peter van Steeden) – 5:29

Personnel 
Jimmy Knepper – trombone
Eddie Engels – trumpet, flugelhorn
Dick Vennik – tenor saxophone
Nico Bunink – piano
Harry Emmery – bass
John Engels – drums

References 

Jimmy Knepper albums
1979 albums